The 2023 Tour des Alpes-Maritimes et du Var was a road cycling stage race that took place between 17 and 19 February 2023 in the departments of Alpes-Maritimes and Var in southeastern France. The race is rated as a category 2.1 event on the 2023 UCI Europe Tour calendar, and is the 55th edition of the Tour des Alpes-Maritimes et du Var.

Teams 
Seven of the 18 UCI WorldTeams, four UCI ProTeams, and seven UCI Continental teams make up the 18 teams that are participating in the race. Each team entered a full squad of seven riders, for a total of 140 riders who started the race.

UCI WorldTeams

 
 
 
 
 
 
 

UCI ProTeams

 
 
 
 

UCI Continental Teams

Route

Stages

Stage 1 
17 February 2023 – Saint-Raphaël to Ramatuelle,

Stage 2 
18 February 2023 – Mandelieu to Azur Arena Antibes,

Stage 3 
19 February 2023 – Villefranche-sur-Mer to Vence,

Classification leadership table

Current classification standings

General classification

Points classification

Mountains classification

Young rider classification

Team classification

References

External links 
 

2023
Tour des Alpes-Maritimes et du Var
Tour des Alpes-Maritimes et du Var
Tour des Alpes-Maritimes et du Var